Juan Antonio Jiménez Martes (March 8, 1949 – October 12, 2008) was a Major League Baseball player from the Dominican Republic.

Sources

1949 births
2008 deaths
Águilas Cibaeñas players
Dominican Republic expatriate baseball players in the United States
Major League Baseball pitchers
Major League Baseball players from the Dominican Republic
Pittsburgh Pirates players